Blindspot is an American crime drama television series created by Martin Gero, starring Sullivan Stapleton and Jaimie Alexander. The series was ordered by NBC on May 1, 2015, and premiered on September 21, 2015. A back nine order was given on October 9, 2015, bringing the first season to a total of 22 episodes, plus an additional episode bringing the order to 23 episodes.

Series overview

Episodes

Season 1 (2015–16)
The episode titles for the first season are anagrams that reveal hints to the plot, which can be strung together to form a coherent paragraph.

Season 2 (2016–17)
The episode titles of the first nine of the second season follow the same anagram formula as the first season. The titles from the tenth episode onward are palindromes; the center letters of the episode titles spell out the phrase "Kurt Weller SOS".

Season 3 (2017–18)
Each episode title in the third season contains a three-letter pattern, in which the first and third letters are the same. The middle letters can be strung together to spell out the phrase "One Of Us Will Give Our Life".

Season 4 (2018–19)
Martin Gero stated that "the puzzle is a homage to some [of] our favorite TV series and how they title the shows." The first letters of each television series spells out the hidden phrase "Is This The Death of the FBI".

Season 5 (2020)
Each episode title in the fifth season contains a word featured in The Gashlycrumb Tinies, a macabre abecedarium. Using the letters from that work accordingly, the season's message is "DRNK YR OVLTN", a reference to secret decoder rings, and specifically the message to "Drink your Ovaltine", decoded by Ralphie in A Christmas Story. Gero and puzzle consultant David Kwong noted that this was the only season puzzle that, as far as they know, went unsolved.

Ratings

Season 1

Season 2

Season 3

Season 4

Season 5

Notes

References

External links
 
 
 

Lists of American crime drama television series episodes